Kvelertak is the debut album by the Norwegian band Kvelertak, released on 21 June 2010 through Indie Recordings. The album was released in North America on 15 March 2011 through The End Records with six bonus tracks—four live recordings from the group's BBC sessions and two demo tracks.

After performing in Oslo, Norway on 24 June 2011, Kvelertak were presented with a gold record certification by Indie Recordings and Dave Grohl of Foo Fighters (the headlining band of the concert). Kvelertak was certified gold by the International Federation of the Phonographic Industry for selling more than 15,000 copies.

The cover artwork was created by John Dyer Baizley of the band Baroness.

Track listing
All songs written and composed by Kvelertak.

Personnel
Kvelertak
 Erlend Hjelvik – vocals
 Vidar Landa – guitar, gang vocals
 Bjarte Lund Rolland – guitar, piano, vocals (on "Sultans of Satan"), gang vocals
 Maciek Ofstad – guitar, vocals (on "Sjøhyenar (Havets Herrer)"), gang vocals
 Marvin Nygaard – bass, gang vocals
 Kjetil Gjermundrød – drums, percussion, gang vocals

Guest musicians
 Ryan McKenney – vocals (on "Offernatt")
 Ivar Nikolaisen – vocals (on "Blodtørst")
 Andreas Tylden – vocals (on "Nekroskop")
 Hoest – vocals (on "Ulvetid")

Production and recording
 Kurt Ballou – mixing, production
 Alan Douches – mastering

Artwork and design
 John Dyer Baizley – artwork
 Marcelo HVC – layout

References

 

Albums with cover art by John Dyer Baizley
Albums produced by Kurt Ballou
2010 albums
Kvelertak albums
Norwegian-language albums